The 2012–13 Eastern Michigan Eagles men's basketball team represented Eastern Michigan University during the 2012–13 NCAA Division I men's basketball season. The Eagles, led by second year head coach Rob Murphy, played their home games at the Eastern Michigan University Convocation Center and were members of the West Division of the Mid-American Conference. They finished the season 16–18, 7–9 in MAC play to finish in fourth place in the West Division. They won two games in the MAC tournament to advance to the quarterfinals where they lost to Western Michigan.

Arrivals
Ray Lee Ranked as the 19th best point guard in the country by Scout.com and the 142nd best player overall in the 2012 class by Rivals.com committed to EMU. Jalen Ross (Greensboro Day School) another PG was a PACIS (Piedmont Athletic Conference of Independent Schools) All-Conference selection and MVP of the Pizza Hut Invitational in high school.

Awards
All-MAC Honorable Mention
Glenn Bryant

Statistics

Conference Team Highs
Scoring Defense (59.1 Pg/G)
3-Point Fg Pct Defense (.299)
Free Throw Pct 1.000 (4-4) at Kentucky (01/02/13)
Conference Individual Highs
Free Throw Pct.
Daylen Harrison vs Eastern Illinois (11-16-12) 1.000 (11-11)	
Anthony Strickland vs Akron (02-13-13)	 1.000 (8-8) 
Conference Opponent Lows
Points 25	 by Northern Illinois (01-26-13)
Field Goals Made 8 by Northern Illinois (01-26-13)
Field Goal Pct .131 (8-61) by Northern Illinois (01-26-13)
Steals 1 by IPFW (11-17-12)
Fouls 7 Michigan (12/20/12)

Roster

James Still was dismissed from the team on November 16, 2012, following a guilty plea in felony charges stemming from an incident in April 2010, when he was enrolled at Providence College (see also 2010–11 Providence Friars men's basketball team#Offseason).

Schedule

|-
!colspan=9| Exhibition

|-
!colspan=9| Regular season

|-
!colspan=9| 2013 MAC men's basketball tournament

^ The game was originally scheduled for 1/30/2013 but was postponed due to the closure of the Ohio campus following an armed robbery of $5 just off campus.

Noteworthy games
The win over Purdue on December 8 was the program's first win over a Big Ten team in nearly 15 years.

The January 26 win over Northern Illinois set several NCAA defensive records, including lowest field goal percentage allowed in a half since the implementation of the shot clock (3.2%), fewest points allowed in a half (4 points), and lowest field goal percentage allowed in a game (13.1%).

References

Eastern Michigan Eagles men's basketball seasons
Eastern Michigan
Eastern Michigan Eagles men's basketball
Eastern Michigan Eagles men's basketball